The Hellenic National Meteorological Service (HNMS) is a government agency responsible for making weather forecasts and observations for Greece. HNMS was founded in 1931 under the Ministry of Aviation and its mission was to cover all the meteorological and climatological needs of the country. It is based at the former Athens International Airport at Elliniko, and operates under the auspices of the Hellenic Air Force, staffed by both military and civilian personnel.

Description 
Among the primary goals of the HNMS is the weather forecast . At the same time, it also provides valuable information on weather and climate, state services, transport, agriculture, sport, etc.

HNMS employs approximately 565 people, in its main building at Elliniko and in branches throughout Greece, as its weather network covers almost the entire country. The class "A" meteorologists are officers from the Hellenic Air Force Academy and civilians from universities formed in meteorology, physics, mathematics and IT. Additional military and civilian personnel of other specialties (administrative, financial, technical, weather observation) complete the staff.

HNMS cooperates with the national weather services of other countries in exchange of meteorological observations, meteorological satellite data, weather radar information, etc... It is part of EUMETNET, EUMETSAT and World Meteorological Organization (WMO).

External links 
 

Climate of Greece
Governmental meteorological agencies in Europe
Military units and formations of the Hellenic Air Force
1931 establishments in Greece
Elliniko-Argyroupoli